Poseidium or Poseidion, also known as Potidaeum or Potidaion or Karpathou Ktoina, was a town of ancient Greece on the island of Karpathos, and served as the harbour of Karpathos.

Its site is located near modern Pigadia i.e. Karpathos Town.

References

Populated places in the ancient Aegean islands
Former populated places in Greece